Gary Phaeton (born February 16, 1985 in Paris) is a French basketball player who played for French Pro A League club Nancy during the 2003-2004 season.

References

External links
 

French men's basketball players
Basketball players from Paris
1985 births
Living people
21st-century French people